Betsy Fagin (born 1972) is an American poet. She is the author of All is Not Yet Lost (Belladonna, 2015), Names Disguised (Make Now Books, 2014) as well as numerous chapbooks including Poverty Rush (Three Sad Tigers, 2011), the science seemed so solid (dusie kollektiv, 2011), Belief Opportunity (Big Game Books Tinyside, 2008), Rosemary Stretch (dusie e/chap, 2006), For every solution there is a problem (Open 24 Hours, 2003), and a number of self-published chapbooks.

She received degrees in literature and creative writing from Vassar College and CUNY Brooklyn College and completed a Master of Library Science degree in information studies at the University of Maryland, College Park, where she was an American Library Association Spectrum Scholar. She was named one of Library Journals Movers & Shakers in 2012, for her work with The People's Library at Occupy Wall Street.  Fagin served as Editor for the Poetry Project Newsletter from 2015–2017. She was awarded a workspace writing residency from Lower Manhattan Cultural Center 2012-2013 and a NYSCA/NYFA fellowship in Poetry in 2017.

Works 

 All is not yet lost (Belladonna* Collaborative,) 
 Names Disguised (Make Now Books,)
 Belief Opportunity, a chapbook (Big Game Books, 2008)
 Rosemary Stretch  a chapbook (Dusie Press Kollektiv, 2006) Available online
 For every solution there is a problem, a chapbook (Open 24 Hours, 2003)

References

Citations 
Hunt, Martin eds. (2018) Letters to the Future: Black Women/Radical Writing. Kore Press. .
Burgess, Matthew ed (2016) Dream Closet: Meditations on Childhood Space. Secretary Press. .

External links 
 
Six poems at The Brooklyn Rail
Five poems at Little Red Leaves
 Three poems at Alice Blue Review
 Two poems at Coconut
 One poem at DC poetry
 Three poems at East Village Poetry Web
 Two poems at Word for/word

1972 births
Living people
American women writers
Vassar College alumni
Brooklyn College alumni
University of Maryland, College Park alumni
21st-century American poets
21st-century American women writers